Olympic Aviation was a subsidiary of Olympic Airways, the Greek national flag carrier.

History
Olympic Aviation began as the light aircraft and helicopter division of Aristotle Onassis's Olympic Airways. It was founded as a separate company by Onassis's son Alexander on August 2, 1971. Its principal purpose was to provide aviation links between mainland Greece and the Greek islands, so its fleet consisted mainly of turboprop aircraft which were small enough to be able to negotiate even the most modest of Greek airports. Olympic Aviation played a significant role for Olympic Airways. It served most domestic destinations of the parent company. The company was also responsible for charter flights in the Olympic Airways Group of Companies, until Macedonian Airlines was created.

Olympic Aviation Flight Academy
The Flight Academy operated under the supervision of Olympic Aviation, and was created in 1970, by Alexander Onassis. The Flight Academy had bought flight simulators for ATR-42/72 aircraft, as well as Boeing 737-200/300/400 aircraft.

Fleet

Fleet at integration with Olympic Airways
ATR 42 (since 1990)
ATR 72 (since 1989)
Boeing 717-200 (since 2000)
Cessna 152
De Havilland Canada Dash 8-100 (since 2003)
Piper Cherokee F
Piper Seminole

The three Boeing 717 aircraft were leased to serve some of Olympic Aviation's European flights, based at Makedonia Airport of Thessaloniki. Shortly after the retirement of the Olympic Airways's Boeing 737-200s, the 717s were used on Olympic Airways's European destinations.

Historical fleet 
Cessna 150K Aerobat (1970-1973)
Dornier 228 (1983-2003)
Piper Aztec D (1968-1992)
Piper Cherokee E (1972-1973)
Piper Cherokee B (1969-1973)
Piper Navajo (1968-1973)
Shorts Skyvan (1970-1990)
Shorts 330-200 (1980-1992)

On December 2003, the flight academy as well as most of the Olympic Airways Group companies, became part of a new company called Olympic Airways - Services S.A.. Olympic Aviation continues to operate, mainly to provide helicopter charter services, under the Olympic Airways - Services management. Its turboprop and jet aircraft fleet, as well as that of Olympic Airways and Macedonian Airlines was integrated into a new company, Olympic Airlines.

Accidents and incidents
August 3, 1989: an Olympic Aviation Short 330, operating as Olympic Aviation Flight 545, flew into the cloud-shrouded Mount Kerkis on Samos island, Greece, while attempting a landing approach. All 3 crew members and 31 passengers were killed.

References

External links

  Olympic Airways - Services S.A.
  Olympic Airlines
  Hellenic Ministry for Transportation and Communications

Airlines established in 1971
Airlines disestablished in 2003
Defunct airlines of Greece
Greek companies established in 1971